Orica Limited is an Australian-based multinational corporation that is one of the world's largest providers of commercial explosives and blasting systems to the mining, quarrying, oil and gas, and construction markets, a supplier of sodium cyanide for gold extraction, and a specialist provider of ground support services in mining and tunnelling.

Orica has a workforce of around 15,000 employees and contractors, servicing customers across more than 100 countries. Orica is listed on the Australian Securities Exchange. It has in recent years been subject to a number of high-profile industrial accidents and fatalities.

History
Initially founded in 1874 as Jones, Scott and Co., a supplier of explosives during the Victorian gold rush, the company was bought by Nobel Industries. Nobel later merged with several British chemical manufacturers to form Imperial Chemical Industries. In 1928, Imperial Chemical Industries of Australia and New Zealand (ICIANZ) was incorporated to acquire and coordinate all the Australasian interests of ICI Plc.

In July 1997, ICI Australia became an independent Australasian company after its parent company, ICI Plc, divested its 62.4 per cent shareholding in the company. As a result of the selldown ICI Australia was required to change its name and on 2 February 1998 became known as Orica.

In 2010, Orica successfully demerged DuluxGroup leaving the company to focus on the provision of services to the mining, construction and infrastructure industries.

In November 2014, Orica Limited announced the sale of its chemicals business to the Blackstone Group. The sale was completed on 2 March 2015, and the chemicals business now operates under the name 'Ixom'.

Financial performance
Orica's revenue in 2016 was AUD$5.1 billion and statutory net profit after tax (NPAT) attributable to the shareholders of Orica for the full year ended 30 September 2016 was $343 million.

Sustainability
Orica is a member of the Dow Jones Sustainability Index (DJSI), the Australian SAM Sustainability Index (AuSSI) and the FTSE4Good Index. These Indexes provide a benchmark for the performance of investments in sustainable companies and funds. Orica releases an annual Sustainability Report that outlines performance against key sustainability metrics.

In 2014, Orica was identified as a global leader in Natural Capital Decoupling, which shows the ability of organisations to 'decouple' financial growth from environmental impact, by increasing revenue whilst decreasing their absolute impact.

Markets/industries
Orica operates across the following markets and industries:
 Surface metal
 Surface coal
 Underground mining
 Underground construction
 Construction
 Quarrying 
 Oil & gas

Products and services
Orica operates three primary business areas:

Blasting
Orica is one of the world's largest provider of commercial explosives and blasting systems to the mining, quarrying, oil and gas, and construction markets.

Products and services
 Contracted services
 Initiators
 Boosters
 Bulk explosives
 Packaged explosives
 Data, reporting & analytics
 Supplementary services
 Seismic systems

Minova
Minova is a member of the Orica Group. Products and services include:
 Steel bolts and plates
 Glassfibre reinforced polymer bolts
 Injectable chemicals and foams
 Mesh
 Resin capsules
 Cementitious grouts & coatings
 Pumps
 Soil anchoring systems
 Ballast bonding polymers
 Accessories and engineering services

Sodium cyanide
Orica is a supplier of sodium cyanide for gold extraction.

Products and services include:
 Analysers
 PRO service
 Data, reporting & analytics
 Sparge
 Training

Orica House

Once Australia's tallest building, the former ICI Building in East Melbourne, now Orica House, was Australia's tallest during the 1950s and was one of the first high-rise buildings in Australia's cities. It is one of the few post-war office buildings to be found on the Victorian Heritage Register.

Incidents

Corporate

Bullying scandal
In March 2015 then CEO Ian Smith was ousted from the business due to bullying of a female employee. During Smith's tenure as CEO, some of the senior leadership within the organisation left for other companies.
Alberto Calderon replaced Ian Smith in 2015 until 2020. Orica’s earnings post Ian smith’s departure experienced a significant decline as well as incurred multiple extraordinary charges. During this time there was also significant turnover within the executive leadership team.

In Australia

Botany, New South Wales

Organochlorines in the Botany aquifer
Remediation began in 2005 after production of chlorinated solvents by ICI over many years resulted in significant contamination of the  aquifer, a high-quality sand aquifer located below the eastern suburbs of Sydney, New South Wales. The main chemical contaminant found in groundwater around the old ICI site is EDC (1,2-dichloroethane), a persistent organic pollutant and byproduct of the manufacture of PVC. Orica has built an A$167 million Groundwater Treatment Plant (GTP) to achieve containment of this contamination and provide high quality industrial water to Botany Industrial Park. Residents in the area were banned from accessing the groundwater. Orica estimated in 2012 that the GTP had been in operation for seven years of its 30-year design life cycle.

Mercury leak, 2011
The Botany chemical plant released mercury vapour into the atmosphere on 27 September 2011, breaching environmental standards for nine hours. An air monitor located near residents at  detected the mercury vapour and the Office of Environment and Heritage was notified. Dr Mariann Lloyd-Smith, said the length of time the emissions lasted was extraordinary, "Mercury is extremely toxic. It is recognised as one of the most important and most hazardous toxins that we deal with, and there is currently a UN negotiation for a global treaty on mercury to address this," she said. The mercury vapour was associated with mercury which had polluted the soil on the Orica site, due to leaking pipes. Robyn Parker, the New South Wales Minister for the Environment & Heritage said "I am incredibly angry and disappointed that yet again we have another incident with Orica." In January 2013, the NSW EPA announced that it would conduct a review of off-site emissions of mercury.

Mercury leak, 2012
On 17 January 2012 Orica reported a mercury leak at its Port Botany plant, the second mercury incident since August 2011. The leak occurred in December 2011 and Orica failed to report the leak to authorities until the following month. The site of the breach was the thermal desorbtion stack at the company's carpark waste remediation project, which was closed when the breach occurred. The NSW Environmental Protection Authority said the incident was not linked to the mercury emissions breach in September at Orica's other Botany site on Beauchamp Road.

Gladstone, Queensland

Cyanide leaks, 2012
On 8 June 2012 the Queensland Department of Environment launched a legal prosecution against Orica in the Gladstone Magistrates' Court. The company was charged with 279 counts of willfully contravening its approvals in relation to alleged cyanide leaks into  Harbour. The government claimed that in January and February 2012, Orica discharged effluent water containing heightened levels of cyanide into Gladstone Harbour. "The charges are related to allegations that the company did not inform The Department of the Environment. The charges related to a breach of conditions rather than any environmental harm per se".

Kooragang, New South Wales
Throughout August and December 2011 Orica had six major chemicals incidents or leaks in Australia. The fourth leak triggered a public forum and NSW Government investigation into the leaks, and the temporary shut down of the Kooragang Island plant.

Hexavalent chromium leak, 2011
Orica's Kooragang Island chemical plant released hexavalent chromium into the atmosphere on 8 August 2011. The known carcinogen was released between 6 and 6:30pm and the spill continued for approximately 20 minutes. An estimated  of hexavalent chromium was discharged from the Orica plant, with another  over the suburb of Stockton. Approximately 20 workers at the plant were exposed as well as 70 nearby homes in Stockton. Orica failed to notify government authorities until 16 hours after the incident and residents were not formally notified for three days. Under a Prevention Notice issued on 11 August 2011, the NSW Office of Environment and Heritage (OEH) closed the ammonia plant at Kooragang Island. The hexavalent chromium leak was the subject of a New South Wales Parliament Upper House inquiry that was concluded in February 2012.

Hunter River arsenic leak, 2011
Effluent containing high levels of arsenic leaked into the Hunter River from the Kooragang Island chemical plant on 19 August 2011 at 3pm. Arsenic had not been used on the site since 1993, however during a cleanup of a hexavalent chromium spill on the site the week prior, old deposits of arsenic leaked into a storage pond and drained into the Hunter River. It was estimated the arsenic concentration was 0.067 milligrams per litre, exceeding licence limits. Barry O'Farrell, the NSW Premier, said "two spills in a fortnight raise reasonable concerns about systemic failures in the way in which this company is operating its facilities." O'Farrell continued, "I've had a gutful of families being distressed, by potential threats to their safety and threats to their local environment."

Ammonia leak, 2011
The venting was due to a relief valve operating to prevent overpressure of a liquid ammonia tank. Engineering studies subsequently revised the amount down to ~. The leak was identified by firefighters responding to an alarm raised by the hospitalisation of two railway workers at  who were affected by the plume of escaping gas. Six fire units and a hazardous chemicals unit were called to the chemical plant to deal with the leak of the ammonia gas. Less than an hour before the ammonia leak, the Environment Protection Authority announced it would take Orica to court over the hexavalent chromium leak which occurred on 8 August 2011 at the same plant.

Ammonium nitrate leak, 2011
Emergency services were called to the site including a HAZMAT team. The spill occurred less than a day after the Environmental Protection Agency announced it would allow the reopening of part of the Kooragang Island plant. Local residents continued to criticise the company for failing to notify residents in a timely manner and called for the plant to remain closed.

Hydrogen stack fire, 2012
On 8 January 2012 lightning ignited hydrogen being released from the plant. Flames higher than  leapt from the hydrogen stack and were reported by local residents to authorities.

Port Kembla, New South Wales

Sulphuric acid leak, 2011
The leak was suspected to be caused by a hole in the ship-to-shore pipeline. Acting chief environmental regulator Mark Gifford from the NSW EPA said he was concerned about the ongoing incidents with Orica.

In Mexico

Coahuila

Explosion, 2007

On 10 September 2007, 28 people were killed and over 250 injured in Coahuila, Mexico, as a result of an accident between a pick-up and a truck which resulted in an explosion. The truck was transporting about 25 metric tons of dynamite under contract for the company Orica near the cities of Monclova and Cuatro Ciénegas. Exact numbers of the dead and injured vary according to source. Orica's website stated there were a total of 28 fatalities in 2007—one worker and 27 contractors/members of the public.

References 

Manufacturing companies based in Melbourne
Companies listed on the Australian Securities Exchange
Chemical companies of Australia
Multinational companies headquartered in Australia